Margie Ackles Jones (1938 – June 29, 2019) was an American figure skater, who competed in ice dance with Charles Phillips.  The pair won the gold medal at the 1960 U.S. Figure Skating Championships.

During her competitive career, Ackles lived in Los Angeles and worked as a secretary for an engineering firm.  She and Phillips were coached by William Kipp.  Ackles retired from skating after the 1960 season and was engaged to be married to Ned Jones shortly afterwards. Margie and Ned had three children, Timothy, Loreen and Randall.  She continued to teach and coach ice dancing for years after retirement.  She skated and coached with the award winning Fabulous Forties synchronized ice dancing team for many years.

Ackles died on June 29, 2019 at age 80.

Competitive highlights 
(with Phillips)

References

Navigation 

1938 births
2019 deaths
American female ice dancers
21st-century American women